Mark Cullen may refer to:

Mark Cullen (writer), American TV and film writer
Mark Cullen (Australian footballer) (born 1968), Australian footballer for Footscray
Mark Cullen (ice hockey) (born 1978), American ice hockey
Mark Cullen (English footballer) (born 1992), English footballer
Mark Cullen (physician), physician, scholar, and population health scientist